Trece is a Paraguayan free-to-air television network launched in 1981. It is the head station of the JBB Group, which as of 11 January 2016 adopted this name. Channel 13 was the second television station to start nationwide broadcasts.

It also airs on the DTT service at channel 27 UHF since October 2017.

References

External links 
  

Television stations in Paraguay
Television channels and stations established in 1981
Spanish-language television stations